Rebecca Seal is a former assistant editor of Observer Food Monthly and Observer Woman and is now a magazine editor and freelance journalist.

Education
Rebecca has a MA in International Peace and Security from King's College London and an BSc in International Relations from the London School of Economics.

Career
Specialising in food, drink and lifestyle pieces, Rebecca has written articles for many magazines and newspapers including Grazia, Red and Olive, The Guardian, The Financial Times, Sunday Telegraph, The Observer, The Times and Sunday Times. Food/drink expert on C4's Sunday Brunch.

Personal life
Rebecca's wedding was at the Asylum Chapel in Peckham, and the reception at the East Dulwich Tavern. Rebecca and husband Steve Joyce have two kids, Isla and Coralie.

Bibliography
Solo: How to Work Alone (and Not Lose Your Mind) - 23 Feb 2021
Leon Fast Vegan - 27 Dec 2018 
Leon Happy One-pot Cooking - 4 Oct 2018
Leon Happy Soups - 5 Oct 2017
Lisbon: Recipes from the Heart of Portugal - 15 Jun 2017
Postcards from Greece - 19 May 2016
The Greenwich Market Cookbook - 22 Mar 2016
Istanbul: Recipes from the heart of Turkey - 8 Jul 2013

Business
Co-Founder of Kemble House Photography Studio

Social media

References 

Living people
Year of birth missing (living people)
Place of birth missing (living people)
Nationality missing
Women magazine editors
British women journalists